Natalia Khoudgarian (born 1973) is a Russian-born Canadian chess player. She was awarded the title of Woman International Master (WIM) by FIDE in 1996.

Khoudgarian won the Canadian women's championship four times: in 2006, 2007, 2011, 2012. She competed in the Women's World Championship in 2006, 2008 and 2012. 
She has played on the Canadian team at the Women's Chess Olympiad in 1996, 2006, 2008, 2012 and 2014.

Khoudgarian is of Armenian descent.

References

External links
Natalia Khoudgarian's biography at nationalchesscamp.com

Natalia Khoudgarian games at 365Chess.com

1973 births
Living people
Chess Woman International Masters
Canadian female chess players
Russian female chess players
Chess Olympiad competitors
Canadian people of Armenian descent
Russian people of Armenian descent
Russian emigrants to Canada
Sportspeople from Moscow
Date of birth missing (living people)
Russian State University of Physical Education, Sport, Youth and Tourism, Department of Chess alumni